Condylon or Kondylon or Condylum or Kondylos  was one of the four fortresses which defended the Vale of Tempe in ancient Thessaly. It was also called Gonno-Condylon, and was one of the towns of the Perrhaebi.

Condylon's site is at a place now called Zesti Vrysi.

References

Populated places in ancient Thessaly
Former populated places in Greece
Perrhaebia